The white-spotted pufferfish (Torquigener albomaculosus) is known for its unique and complex courtship display which involves creating large, geometric circles in the sand. These circles are constructed in an effort to attract females for copulation. Males must maintain their circles in order to attract a mate. A female will evaluate the structure and choose to mate with the males after evaluation and completion of other mating behaviors.

The geometric circles had first been noticed by divers in 1995, but it was not discovered that they were created by white-spotted pufferfish until 2013 when the species was discovered in the Ryukyu Islands. It is thought that white-spotted pufferfish are the only species of their kind to engage in this type of mating ritual.

Discovery 
The white-spotted pufferfish is a relatively small (10 cm) fish that was named in 2014 by a research group for the National Museum of Nature and Science. The fish has a brownish-yellow body with white spots and the ventral part of the body is translucent. The study specimens were collected off the south coast of Amami Ōshima in the Ryukyu Islands. Naming this species took the genus Torquigener to a total of 20 species.

The species was first discovered to be the manufacturers of highly ordered, large, circular sand structures on the sea floor in 2013. These structures have been observed by local scuba divers since 1995, although it was not yet known how they were formed. In 2012 an underwater photographer observed a pufferfish forming this structure. Torquigener albomaculosus is thought to be the only species of pufferfish to engage in this behaviour.

Similar sand structures were found off the coast of Western Australia beyond 100 m water depth and believed to be pufferfish nests.

Description 
These structures are found at depths of 10–30 m on the seabed off the south coast of the Amami Ōshima Island. These circular structures are geometrically ordered with a diameter of 2 meters and are formed in 7–9 days. The outer ring of the nest consists of a series of mountains and groves and the center is an irregular maze like pattern. The center is formed with very fine sand particles with respect to the outer portion. It is now thought that they are the most ordered structures created by any fish. 

The fish begins making the structure by forming a simple circle shape in the sand using its belly. Once this is complete the fish makes the valleys and peaks by waving its fins while swimming in a straight line from the outside to the inside of the nest. The center is formed by either inside to the outside or outside to inside movements, while waving its anal fin to form the irregular pattern. Through these movements very fine sand particles are moved to the center. Once the structure is completed, it is maintained until spawning by continuing the same inward-outward movements. After spawning the structure gradually deteriorates since maintenance behavior is halted.

Purpose of the "mystery circles"

Female choice 
This behavior is an example of a mating ritual, because it is used to attract mates and raise their young. It is assumed that the nest is important in female choice, however, there are no definitive factors known to influence the females’ choice. There are a number of possible factors to consider, such as size and number of peaks/valleys, size of circle, sand composition and color. This is also believed to be the most geometrically ordered structure created by any fish. There is evidence that females may be able to predict male body size and thus health of the fish from the structure formed. Larger males were shown to push sand further than smaller males, thus making larger spaces between peaks of the outer ring structure than those of a smaller male’s nest. Females may be able to recognize these differences and assess whom she wants to mate with.

In addition to this, two more courtship behaviors are carried out by the males before spawning. When females approached the nest, the males would stir up the sand in the nest, and then performed a rush and retreat behavior to the females. It is hypothesized that the stirring of the sand is to show females the quality and quantity of the sand in the structure. For the rush and repeat behavior, the males would move to the outer portion of the nest then rush towards the females, then retreat back to the outer ring. After these courtship behaviors, the female will decide whether or not to spawn.

Mating 
Spawning occurs from spring to summer. If a female decides to mate after the male performs the courtship behaviors, she will descend to the floor of the nest and the male will approach her. Mating occurs in pairs and they will press their bodies together and vibrate until the female releases her gametes in the nest. Males may mate with multiple females in one day.

Parental care 
After mating, the females leave the nest and the males stay. The males will no longer perform maintenance on the nest once the eggs are deposited. Males will care for the eggs and protect them until they hatch. They will chase off predators or other rival males that come to the nest. Eggs hatch around five days after mating, and the nest slowly deteriorates over this time. After hatching, males leave and will not use the same nest again.

References 

Fish reproduction
Tetraodontidae